Jelutong, Penang, is a suburb of Georgetown, Penang, Malaysia. Jelutong may refer to:

 Jelutong (federal constituency), Penang, represented in the Dewan Rakyat
 Jelutong (tree), a species of tropical tree (Dyera costulata)

See also
 Bukit Jelutong, a suburb in Selangor, Malaysia